Crates is a Greek given name (Κράτης), pronounced as two syllables. It may refer to:
 Crates (comic poet) (probably fl. late 450s or very early 440s BC), Old Comedy poet and actor from Athens
 Crates (engineer), 4th century BC engineer who accompanied Alexander the Great
 Crates of Thebes (c. 365-c. 285 BC), Hellenistic Cynic philosopher
 Crates of Athens (died 268-264 BC), Polemon's successor as head of the Platonic Academy
 Crates of Mallus, 2nd century BC Greek grammarian and Stoic philosopher
 Crates of Tralles, a rhetorician

See also
 Danny Crates (born 1973), British former Paralympic sprinter
 Crate (disambiguation)
 Crates Bay, Antarctic Peninsula
 Craits, a card game sometimes spelled Crates